The following is a list of naturalized soccer players who have represented their naturalized country at a FIFA international tournament. The list includes players both past and present after they have represented their new nation at least once. These list excludes players whose citizenship status is unrecognized by FIFA and therefore treated the same was as naturalized players as per FIFA eligibility rules

Asian Football Confederation

CONCACAF

UEFA 

Naturalized